Several vessels have been named African Queen:

 was built in the East Indies in 1775, probably under a different name. She first appeared in Lloyd's Register (LR) as African Queen in 1787. She made one voyage as a slave ship and then sailed between England and North America. She foundered in 1793.
 was built at Folkestone in 1780, though almost surely under a different name. She became a slave ship in 1792 and made two complete slave voyages. On her first slave voyage she suffered a high mortality, both among her slaves and her captains and crew. A privateer captured her in 1795 as she was on her way to Jamaica with slaves while on her third slave trading voyage.
 was a foreign vessel, launched in 1789 or 1790. The British captured her in 1796 and by 1797 she was sailing out of Bristol. She made one voyage to Africa during which she was captured and recaptured and then became a slave ship. She made one voyage to the West Indies as a merchant ship, and one voyage as a whaler, but was damaged in 1801 as she returned home from that whaling voyage and apparently never sailed again.

Ship names